The Bugisu Cooperative Union (BCU) is a Ugandan agricultural cooperative federation, established in July 1954.
It was started by a group of coffee farmers led by The Late EV.Samson Kitutu. A new Bugisu coffee ordinance was enacted in 1955 providing for BCU ltd to take over all the marketing functions from the Bugisu coffee scheme as well as all the scheme's assets except the reserve funds which were still held by Bugisu coffee board for more visit the website of bugisu cooperative union bugisucooperativeunion.com

Overview
BCU is owned by coffee farmers who are organised in primary societies. Each primary society keeps a register of its fully paid-up members who elect a committee, which manages society's affairs. Each Primary society is represented by two delegates at an Annual General Meeting. In addition to other functions the AGM elects Board members who in turn appoint and supervise the management team. BCU also operates according to International Co-operatives Principles.

Methods of Farming
The Arabica coffee in Bugisu grows on volcanic soils at an altitude of between 3800 ft and 14700 ft above sea level. The roasted Arabica coffee beans  have a mild sweet aroma and good taste. Arabica coffee is grown on small gardens owned by individual farmers . This coffee is mostly organically grown but in some cases fertilizers are applied.

Processing
Primary Processing involves the pulping of ripe coffee cherries, the fermenting, the washing  thoroughly with clean water and drying it on wire mesh placed two meters above the ground to avoid contamination.

In addition, BCU owns central pulperies where coffee berries  are pulped on large scale and dried under controlled temperatures. After the coffee has dried the farmer sells it to the primary society, which in turn delivers it to BCU mill. At BCU curing works, coffee is inspected, tasted for moisture content and weighed before it is stored in the soil.

Location
BCU Ltd is situated on Plot 46 Pallisa Road in Mbale town in Bugisu sub-region in Eastern Ugandan, East Africa. It is 256 kilometers (160 miles) from kampala, the capital city. Bugisu is found on the slopes of Mt.Elgon.

References

Coffee production
Agricultural cooperatives
Articles containing video clips
Kumusha
Agriculture companies of Uganda
Cooperatives in Uganda